National Unified Leadership of the Honduran Revolutionary Movement was a front of leftwing groups in Honduras. Formed in 1983, the front consisted of Revolutionary Popular Forces Lorenzo Zelaya, Communist Party of Honduras, Revolutionary Unity Movement, Morazanist Front for the Liberation of Honduras, People's Liberation Movement-Chinchoneros and the Central American Workers' Revolutionary Party.

References

Defunct left-wing political party alliances
Political party alliances in Honduras
Popular fronts
Honduras